Han Qi, posthumously known as Xuanzi of Han, was a Chinese monarch and politician who served as the head minister of the state of Han and then military leader and prime minister of the State of Jin. He was the son of Han Jue and served as zhengqing (正卿) and zhongjunjiang of Jin between 541 and 514 BCE. 

In 541 BCE, he succeeded Wenzi of Zhao and became the 15th zhongjunjiang. Henceforth, he governed Jin until his death. He was the longest serving zhengqing and zhongjunjiang of Jin. During his regency, Jin annexed the State of Fei (肥, in today's Gaocheng District, Shijiazhuang) in 530 BCE, the tribe of Luhun Rong (陸渾戎) in 525 BCE, and the State of Gu (鼓) in 520 BCE.

Although Han Qi held the post of zhongjunjiang for 27 years, he was largely absent from the central political arena of Jin. Xun Wu, Shi Yang, Xun Li, and the heads of Zhonghang, Fan, and Zhi clans controlled the State of Jin and its army. They implemented the policy of expansion but only focused on minor states. Chu, a major enemy of Jin, was ignored by Jin during his rule. 

After his death, his son, Han Xu, succeeded him as the head of Han and Wei Shu (魏舒) succeeded the post of zhengqing and zhongjunjiang of Jin.

Ancestors

References 

Monarchs of Han (state)
Zhongjunjiang of Jin
Zhou dynasty nobility
Zhou dynasty politicians